Kanakia is a genus of cicadas in the family Cicadidae. There are about seven described species in Kanakia.

Species
These seven species belong to the genus Kanakia:
 Kanakia congrua Goding & Froggatt, 1904 c g
 Kanakia fuscocosta Delorme, 2016 c g
 Kanakia gigas Boulard, 1988 c g
 Kanakia paniensis Delorme, 2016 c g
 Kanakia rana Delorme, 2016 c g
 Kanakia salesnii Delorme, 2016 c g
 Kanakia typica Distant, 1892 c g
Data sources: i = ITIS, c = Catalogue of Life, g = GBIF, b = Bugguide.net

References

Further reading

 
 
 
 

Cicadettini
Cicadidae genera